Ohev Sholom – The National Synagogue (previously Ohev Sholom Talmud Torah) (Hebrew for Lovers of Peace and Study of Torah); OSTNS is the oldest Orthodox synagogue in Washington, D.C.

The synagogue is located in the neighborhood of Shepherd Park. It was formed from the merger of two earlier synagogues, Ohev Sholom and Talmud Torah.

Name
The copyrighted name "The National Synagogue" has been controversial.  While it echoes the name of the Washington National Cathedral, it does not signify the same relationship to the federal government. The cathedral's charter was passed by an act of the United States Congress. The National Synagogue has no such governmental designation.

History
Ohev Sholom Talmud Torah was formed in 1958 as a merger between Ohev Sholom Congregation, founded as Chai Adon Congregation in 1886, and Talmud Torah Congregation (the synagogue in which the father of Al Jolson once served as cantor), founded three years later. Ohev Sholom was previously situated at 5th and I Streets, NW, while Talmud Torah was previously situated at 14th and Emerson Streets, NW, having moved there from E Street in Southwest Washington. Their combined Shepherd Park building opened in 1960. Membership fell in the late twentieth century as Jewish families moved to the suburbs. The synagogue opened a branch composed largely of younger families in Olney, Maryland, in 1994, which became the separate congregation Ohev Sholom Talmud Torah Congregation of Olney between 2002 and 2005.  Only a few, mostly older families, were left at the Washington DC location.  

Early in the new century, a number of families who preferred urban life decided to attempt to revive Orthodox Jewish life in Shepherd Park. Hiring a new rabbi, Shmuel Herzfeld who was formerly the associate rabbi at the Hebrew Institute of Riverdale synagogue headed by Rabbi Avi Weiss, was central to this effort. The decision to rename the synagogue "The National Synagogue" in 2005 drew a good deal of criticism, not least from among other Jews, who felt that the name was a marketing label inaccurately implying a special position of leadership in the American Jewish community. Rabbi Herzfeld defended the choice on the grounds that the name makes clear that the synagogue is welcoming and open to everyone.  Herzfeld insisted that in spite of the copyright on the phrase, other synagogues should feel free to use the same label.

The synagogue is noted as a particularly vibrant and fast-growing institution.  Under Rabbi Herzfeld's leadership, it has taken a number of unusual initiatives, including advertising its services with leaflets and television and radio spots, holding free Yom Kippur services, and the installation of ramps and elevators to ensure that the synagogue is genuinely open to everyone. The National Synagogue has unusual financing for an American synagogue;  it is primarily funded by large donations rather than member dues, and so member dues are much smaller than at other area synagogues, while outreach efforts are much greater.

Today
Ohev Sholom – The National Synagogue advertises itself as a dynamic Orthodox community that values Torah, prayer, and good deeds. The congregation touts its location in NW Washington as easily accessible to surrounding neighborhoods in the District of Columbia and Maryland. The congregation counts in its membership a growing number of working professionals, families with small children, and others.

Notes

External resources

 Web site of Ohev Sholom Talmud Torah

Ashkenazi Jewish culture in Washington, D.C.
Ashkenazi synagogues
Colonial Village
Modern Orthodox synagogues in the United States
Open Orthodox Judaism
Synagogues in Washington, D.C.
Religious organizations established in 1958
1958 establishments in Washington, D.C.
Synagogues completed in 1960